Zalesye is a rural locality (a village) in Posyolok Velikodvorsky, Gus-Khrustalny District, Vladimir Oblast, Russia. The population was 122 as of 2010. There are 2 streets.

Geography 
Zalesye is located on the Ninur River, 44 km south of Gus-Khrustalny (the district's administrative centre) by road. Velikodvorsky is the nearest rural locality.

References 

Rural localities in Gus-Khrustalny District